"Lake of Fire" is a song by the American alternative rock band the Meat Puppets. It appears on their 1984 album Meat Puppets II and also appears as a hidden track on their 1994 album Too High to Die.

The Meat Puppets have played this song at most of their concerts, and even after the Meat Puppets, Curt Kirkwood has performed this song himself at most of his concerts. "Lake of Fire" was notably covered by Nirvana on MTV Unplugged, in 1993.

Background

Curt Kirkwood said, "I lived with [bandmates] Cris and Derrick, and probably Cris' girlfriend, Kelly. ... They went to a Halloween party and I was disgruntled because I thought it was nonsense that adults should callously attempt to alter their appearances, that we are already sufficiently foul. ... I was younger then. I just said, 'Talk about man's fall from grace. This is it.'" He also described the song as a "toss-off" and a "cartoon".

Promo single
The fourth promotional release to boost the Too High to Die record. Released after they played on MTV Unplugged with Nirvana.

Track listing
(All songs by Curt Kirkwood unless otherwise noted)

 "Lake of Fire" (1994 version) – 3:12
 "Lake of Fire" (acoustic version) – 1:58
 "Lake of Fire" (live) – 2:56

Nirvana cover

Along with the Meat Puppets' songs "Plateau" and "Oh, Me", the popular grunge band Nirvana performed "Lake of Fire" for their MTV Unplugged appearance in 1993 and were joined by the Kirkwood brothers. This version appears on Nirvana's 1994 live album, MTV Unplugged in New York and was released as a promotional single in Australia, where it received some radio airplay.

Weekly charts

Year-end charts

Other covers
 In 2020 Gramatik recorded a version featuring the vocals of Bill Burr titled "lake of fire flip".
 Lena Hall recorded a live version of the song for her 2015 album Sin & Salvation: Live at the Carlyle.
In 2018, Eric Bachmann covered the song and released it as a single. His cover was also featured in the 2018 film Tag.

See also
Fire and brimstone

References

External links
Songfacts – Lake of Fire
Meat Puppets' website

1994 singles
Meat Puppets songs
Nirvana (band) songs
Songs written by Curt Kirkwood
London Records singles
1984 songs